Goyeneche may refer to:

People
 José Manuel de Goyeneche, 1st Count of Guaqui (1776–1846), royalist general in the Spanish American wars of independence
 Roberto Goyeneche (1926–1994), Argentine tango singer 
 Vicente Carvallo y Goyeneche (1742–1816), Chilean soldier

See also
 Goyeneche Palace (disambiguation)

Basque-language surnames